Bartlett's Familiar Quotations, often simply called Bartlett's, is an American reference work that is the longest-lived and most widely distributed collection of quotations. The book was first issued in 1855 and is currently in its nineteenth edition, published in 2022.

The book arranges its entries by author, rather than by subject, as many other quotation collections, and enters the authors chronologically by date of birth rather than alphabetically. Within years, authors are arranged alphabetically and quotations are arranged chronologically within each author's entry, followed by "attributed" remarks whose source in the author's writings has not been confirmed. The book contains a thorough keyword index and details the source of each quotation.

History
John Bartlett, who ran the University Book Store in Cambridge, Massachusetts, was frequently asked for information on quotations and he began a commonplace book of them for reference. Bartlett is generally supposed to have drawn the quotations in his book from his own extensive reading and prodigious memory and a commonplace book he kept. But he acknowledged in the 1855 preface that "this Collection ... has been considerably enlarged by additions from an English work on a similar plan." That work, Hancher found, was named in some reviews of the time as the Handbook of Familiar Quotations from English Authors written by Isabella Rushton Preston (London, 1853). Bartlett's Familiar Quotations has a somewhat shadowy editorial provenance. In 1855, he privately printed his compilation as A Collection of Familiar Quotations. This first edition contained 258 pages of quotations by 169 authors, chiefly the Bible, William Shakespeare, and the great English poets. Bartlett wrote in the fourth edition that "it is not easy to determine in all cases the degree of familiarity that may belong to phrases and sentences which present themselves for admission; for what is familiar to one class of readers may be quite new to another."

The book was a great success, and Bartlett issued three more editions before joining the Boston publishing firm of Little, Brown and Company. Bartlett rose to be the senior partner of the firm and supervised nine editions of the work before his death in 1905, the work selling over 300,000 copies. The seventh edition had appeared in 1875, the eighth edition in 1882, and the ninth in 1891. The tenth edition, however, would not appear for more than twenty years.

Edited by Nathan Haskell Dole, the tenth edition (1914) also known as the author's edition was much like its predecessors.  The book began with quotations originally in English, arranging them chronologically by author (Geoffrey Chaucer was the first entry, Mary Frances Butts the last). These quotes were chiefly from literary sources. A "miscellaneous" section follows of quotations in English from politicians and scientists (such as "fifty-four forty or fight!"). A section of "translations" follows, consisting mainly of lines from the ancient Greeks and Romans. The last section was devoted to the Bible and the Book of Common Prayer. Quotations were arranged in a single column.

The eleventh edition (1937), edited by Christopher Morley (1890–1957) and Louella D. Everett, expanded the page size and created a two-column format, making it the first edition that is recognizable to users of the modern work. A twelfth edition (1948) was also edited by Morley and Everett.

The thirteenth edition (1955) was billed by the publisher as the "Centennial Edition". While the work was credited to the editors of Little, Brown, the preface gives special thanks to Morley and Everett as well as Emily Morison Beck (1915–2004). The volume continued to add more recent material, the two youngest authors being cartoonist Bill Mauldin and Queen Elizabeth II. Beck also edited the fourteenth edition (1968) and the fifteenth (1980). Aram Bakshian said Beck's work on the fifteenth edition was the start of the work's downfall: "Donning the intellectual bell-bottoms and platform shoes of its era, Bartlett's began spouting third-rate Third World, youth-culture, and feminist quotes", part of "a middle-aged obsession with staying trendy."

Following Beck's retirement, Little, Brown entrusted the editorship to Justin Kaplan, whose life of Mark Twain, Mr. Clemens and Mark Twain, had won the 1967 Pulitzer Prize. Kaplan brought out the sixteenth edition (1993) to criticism in part because he included only three minor Ronald Reagan quotations and commented publicly he despised Reagan. (Franklin D. Roosevelt had 35 entries and John F. Kennedy had 28.) Jonathan Siegel, who edited the Macmillan Book of Political Quotations, said Kaplan was "an insult to the memory of John Bartlett and the ideologically inclusive spirit of the first fifteen editions." Kaplan was also criticized for including pop culture material that was considered neither "familiar" nor durable. Similar criticisms were leveled against his editing of the seventeenth edition (2003) which included entries for the first time from J. K. Rowling, Jerry Seinfeld, and Larry David. Classics were cut: eleven quotations by Alexander Pope were dropped, as were what Kaplan considered high-sounding sentimental quotes. Kaplan did include six Reagan quotations, and he told USA Today "I admit I was carried away by prejudice. Mischievously I did him dirty."

The eighteenth edition (2012) was edited by poet, critic, and editor Geoffrey O'Brien, who was also the editor-in-chief of the Library of America. He continues as editor for the nineteenth edition (2022).

See also
 The Oxford Dictionary of Quotations
 The Yale Book of Quotations

Notes

References 
In addition to the prefaces of various editions of Bartlett's, the following sources were useful:
Aram Bakshian, Jr.  "Bartlett's familiar quotas".  National Review.  v. 45, n. 22.  November 15, 1993.  60–61.
"Bartlett's selective memory".  Alberta Report.  v. 21, n. 3.  January 3, 1994. 15.
Caroline Benham.  "Cuts from 'Bartlett's Familiar Quotations'.  USA Today.  October 17, 2002.
James Gleick.  "Bartlett Updated".  The New York Times Book Review.  August 8, 1993.  3.
Roger Kimball.  "You Can Look It Up".  The Wall Street Journal.  October 18, 2002.
Douglas Martin.  "Emily Morison Beck, 88, Dies, Edited Bartlett's Quotations".  The New York Times.  March 31, 2004.  C13.
Adam Meyerson.  "Editing History".  Reader's Digest.  v. 144, issue 863.  March 1994.  104.
Adam Meyerson.  "Mr. Kaplan, Tear Down This Wall".  Policy Review.  Fall 1993.  Issue 66.  4+.
Robin Roger.  "Up to the minute".  Commentary.  v. 95, n. 5.  May 1993.  56–58.

External links
 
 Online copy of the 10th edition (1914) at Bartleby.com (text pages, searchable)
 Online copy of the 12th edition (1951) at Archive.org
 Online copy of the 14th edition (1968) at Archive.org (PDF, OCR text, TIFF)
 

1855 books
2003 books
Books of quotations
Little, Brown and Company books
English-language books
American non-fiction literature